The Isles of Scilly (or ) is an archipelago off the southwestern tip of Cornwall, England. One of the islands, St Agnes, is the most southerly point in Britain, being over  further south than the most southerly point of the British mainland at Lizard Point.

The total population of the islands at the 2011 United Kingdom census was 2,203. Scilly forms part of the ceremonial county of Cornwall, and some services are combined with those of Cornwall. However, since 1890, the islands have had a separate local authority. Since the passing of the Isles of Scilly Order 1930, this authority has had the status of a county council and today is known as the Council of the Isles of Scilly.

The adjective "Scillonian" is sometimes used for people or things related to the archipelago. The Duchy of Cornwall owns most of the freehold land on the islands. Tourism is a major part of the local economy, along with agriculture—particularly the production of cut flowers.

Etymology 
Historically, the Isles of Scilly were known in Latin as Insulae Sillinae, Silina or Siluruni, corresponding to Greek forms Σίλυρες and Σύρινες. In the Late Middle Ages they were known to European navigators as Sorlingas (Spanish, Portuguese) or Sorlingues (French). The etymology is unknown. Some authors suggest the Latin Sillinae is derived or related to solis insulae, "the Isles of the Sun".

History

Early history 
The islands may correspond to the Cassiterides ('Tin Isles') believed by some to have been visited by the Phoenicians, and mentioned by the Greeks. However, there is no evidence of substantial tin mining activity on the islands.

The isles were off the coast of the Brittonic Celtic kingdom of Dumnonia and later its offshoot, Kernow (Cornwall), and may have been a part of these polities until their conquest by the English in the 10th century AD.

It is likely that until relatively recent times the islands were much larger and perhaps joined into one island named Ennor. Rising sea levels flooded the central plain around 400–500 AD, forming the current 55 islands and islets, if an island is defined as "land surrounded by water at high tide and supporting land vegetation". The word  is a contraction of the Old Cornish  (mutated to ), meaning 'the land' or the 'great island'.

Evidence for the older large island includes:

 A description written during Roman times designates Scilly "" in the singular, indicating either a single island or an island much bigger than any of the others.
 Remains of a prehistoric farm have been found on Nornour, which is now a small rocky skerry far too small for farming. There once was an Iron Age British community here that extended into Roman times. This community was likely formed by immigrants from Brittany, probably the Veneti who were active in the tin trade that originated in mining activity in Cornwall and Devon.
 At certain low tides the sea becomes shallow enough for people to walk between some of the islands. This is possibly one of the sources for stories of drowned lands, e.g. Lyonesse.
 Ancient field walls are visible below the high tide line off some of the islands, such as Samson.
 Some of the Cornish language place names also appear to reflect past shorelines, and former land areas.
 The whole of southern England has been steadily sinking in opposition to post-glacial rebound in Scotland: this has caused the rias (drowned river valleys) on the southern Cornish coast, e.g. River Fal and the Tamar Estuary.

Offshore, midway between Land's End and the Isles of Scilly, is the supposed location of the mythical lost land of Lyonesse, referred to in Arthurian literature, of which Tristan is said to have been a prince.

Scilly has been identified as the place of exile of two heretical 4th century bishops, Instantius and Tiberianus, who were followers of Priscillian.

Norse and Norman period 

In 995, Olaf Tryggvason became King Olaf I of Norway. Born  960, Olaf had raided various European cities and fought in several wars. In 986 he met a Christian seer on the Isles of Scilly. He was probably a follower of Priscillian and part of the tiny Christian community that was exiled here from Spain by Emperor Maximus for Priscillianism. In Snorri Sturluson's Royal Sagas of Norway, it is stated that this seer told him:
Thou wilt become a renowned king, and do celebrated deeds. Many men wilt thou bring to faith and baptism, and both to thy own and others' good; and that thou mayst have no doubt of the truth of this answer, listen to these tokens. When thou comest to thy ships many of thy people will conspire against thee, and then a battle will follow in which many of thy men will fall, and thou wilt be wounded almost to death, and carried upon a shield to thy ship; yet after seven days thou shalt be well of thy wounds, and immediately thou shalt let thyself be baptised.

The legend continues that, as the seer foretold, Olaf was attacked by a group of mutineers upon returning to his ships. As soon as he had recovered from his wounds, he let himself be baptised. He then stopped raiding Christian cities, and lived in England and Ireland. In 995, he used an opportunity to return to Norway. When he arrived, the Haakon Jarl was facing a revolt. Olaf Tryggvason persuaded the rebels to accept him as their king, and Jarl Haakon was murdered by his own slave, while he was hiding from the rebels in a pig sty.

With the Norman Conquest, the Isles of Scilly came more under centralised control. About 20 years later, the Domesday survey was conducted. The islands would have formed part of the "Exeter Domesday" circuit, which included Cornwall, Devon, Dorset, Somerset, and Wiltshire.

In the mid-12th century, there was reportedly a Viking attack on the Isles of Scilly, called  by the Norse, recorded in the —Sweyn Asleifsson "went south, under Ireland, and seized a barge belonging to some monks in Syllingar and plundered it." (Chap LXXIII)

...the three chiefs—Swein, Þorbjörn and Eirik—went out on a plundering expedition. They went first to the Suðreyar [Hebrides], and all along the west to the Syllingar, where they gained a great victory in Maríuhöfn on Columba's-mass [9 June], and took much booty. Then they returned to the Orkneys.

"" literally means "Mary's Harbour/Haven". The name does not make it clear if it referred to a harbour on a larger island than today's St Mary's, or a whole island.

It is generally considered that Cornwall, and possibly the Isles of Scilly, came under the dominion of the English Crown late in the reign of Æthelstan ( 924–939). In early times one group of islands was in the possession of a confederacy of hermits. King Henry I (r. 1100–35) gave it to the abbey of Tavistock who established a priory on Tresco, which was abolished at the Reformation.

Later Middle Ages and early modern period 

At the turn of the 14th century, the Abbot and convent of Tavistock Abbey petitioned the king,

stat[ing] that they hold certain isles in the sea between Cornwall and Ireland, of which the largest is called Scilly, to which ships come passing between France, Normandy, Spain, Bayonne, Gascony, Scotland, Ireland, Wales and Cornwall: and, because they feel that in the event of a war breaking out between the kings of England and France, or between any of the other places mentioned, they would not have enough power to do justice to these sailors, they ask that they might exchange these islands for lands in Devon, saving the churches on the islands appropriated to them.

William le Poer, coroner of Scilly, is recorded in 1305 as being worried about the extent of wrecking in the islands, and sending a petition to the King. The names provide a wide variety of origins, e.g. Robert and Henry Sage (English), Richard de Tregenestre (Cornish), Ace de Veldre (French), Davy Gogch (possibly Welsh, or Cornish), and Adam le Fuiz Yaldicz (possibly Spanish).

It is not known at what point the islanders stopped speaking the Cornish language, but the language seems to have gone into decline in Cornwall beginning in the Late Middle Ages; it was still dominant between the islands and Bodmin at the time of the Reformation, but it suffered an accelerated decline thereafter. The islands appear to have lost the old Celtic language before parts of Penwith on the mainland, in contrast to the history of Irish or Scottish Gaelic.

During the English Civil War, the Parliamentarians captured the isles, only to see their garrison mutiny and return the isles to the Royalists. By 1651 the Royalist governor, Sir John Grenville, was using the islands as a base for privateering raids on Commonwealth and Dutch shipping. The Dutch admiral Maarten Tromp sailed to the isles and on arriving on 30 May 1651 demanded compensation. In the absence of compensation or a satisfactory reply, he declared war on England in June. It was during this period that the disputed Three Hundred and Thirty Five Years' War started between the isles and the Netherlands.

In June 1651, Admiral Robert Blake recaptured the isles for the Parliamentarians. Blake's initial attack on Old Grimsby failed, but the next attacks succeeded in taking Tresco and Bryher. Blake placed a battery on Tresco to fire on St Mary's, but one of the guns exploded, killing its crew and injuring Blake. A second battery proved more successful. Subsequently, Grenville and Blake negotiated terms that permitted the Royalists to surrender honourably. The Parliamentary forces then set to fortifying the islands. They built Cromwell's Castle—a gun platform on the west side of Tresco—using materials scavenged from an earlier gun platform further up the hill. Although this poorly sited earlier platform dated back to the 1550s, it is now referred to as King Charles's Castle.

The Isles of Scilly served as a place of exile during the English Civil War. Among those exiled there was Unitarian Jon Biddle.

During the night of 22 October 1707, the isles were the scene of one of the worst maritime disasters in British history, when out of a fleet of 21 Royal Navy ships headed from Gibraltar to Portsmouth, six were driven onto the cliffs. Four of the ships sank or capsized, with at least 1,450 dead, including the commanding admiral Sir Cloudesley Shovell.

There is evidence of inundation by the tsunami caused by the 1755 Lisbon earthquake.

Geography 

The islands' position produces a place of great contrast; the ameliorating effect of the sea, greatly influenced by the North Atlantic Current, means they rarely have frost or snow, which allows local farmers to grow flowers well ahead of those in mainland Britain. The chief agricultural product is cut flowers, mostly daffodils. Exposure to Atlantic winds also means that spectacular winter gales lash the islands from time to time. This is reflected in the landscape, most clearly seen on Tresco where the lush Abbey Gardens on the sheltered southern end of the island contrast with the low heather and bare rock sculpted by the wind on the exposed northern end.

Natural England has designated the Isles of Scilly as National Character Area 158. As part of a 2002 marketing campaign, the plant conservation charity Plantlife chose sea thrift (Armeria maritima) as the "county flower" of the islands.

(1)  Inhabited until 1855.

In 1975 the islands were designated as an Area of Outstanding Natural Beauty. The designation covers the entire archipelago, including the uninhabited islands and rocks, and is the smallest such area in the UK. The islands of Annet and Samson have large terneries and the islands are well populated by seals. The Isles of Scilly are the only British haunt of the lesser white-toothed shrew (Crocidura suaveolens), where it is known locally as a "teak" or "teke".

The islands are famous among birdwatchers for the large variety of rare and migratory birds that visit the islands. The peak time of year for sightings is generally in the autumn.

Tidal influx 
Additionally, the inter-island waters are mostly shallow, which at spring tides allows for dry land walking between several of the islands. Many of the northern islands can be reached from Tresco, including Bryher, Samson and St Martin's (requires very low tides). From St Martin's White Island, Little Ganilly and Great Arthur are reachable. Although the sound between St Mary's and Tresco, The Road, is fairly shallow, it never becomes totally dry, but according to some sources it should be possible to wade at extreme low tides. Around St Mary's several minor islands become accessible, including Taylor's Island on the west coast and Tolls Island on the east coast. From Saint Agnes, Gugh becomes accessible at each low tide, via a tombolo.

Climate 

The Isles of Scilly have a temperate oceanic climate (Köppen climate classification: Cfb), which borders a humid subtropical climate (Cf) under the Trewartha climate classification. Winters are, by far, the warmest in the UK due to the moderating effects of the North Atlantic Drift of the Gulf Stream. Despite being on exactly the same latitude as Winnipeg in Canada, snow and frost are extremely rare. Summer heat is moderated by the Atlantic Ocean and summer temperatures are not as warm as on the mainland. However, the Isles are one of the sunniest areas in the southwest with an average of seven hours per day in May. The isles have never recorded a temperature below freezing in the months from May to November inclusive. The wettest months are from October to January, while April and May are the driest months.

Geology 

All the islands of Scilly are all composed of granite rock of Early Permian age, an exposed part of the Cornubian batholith. The Irish Sea Glacier terminated just to the north of the Isles of Scilly during the last ice age.

Ancient monuments and historic buildings 

Historic sites on the Isles of Scilly include:
 Bant's Carn, a Bronze Age entrance grave
 Halangy Down Ancient Village
 Porth Hellick Down Burial Chamber
 Innisidgen Lower and Upper Burial Chambers
 The Old Blockhouse
 King Charles's Castle
 Harry's Walls, an unfinished artillery fort
 Garrison Tower
 Cromwell's Castle

Flora and fauna

Government

Governors of Scilly

Historically, the Isles of Scilly were primarily ruled by a Proprietor/Governor. The governor was a military commission made by the monarch in consultation with the Admiralty in recognition of the islands' strategic position. The office of Governor was pre-eminent in military law but not in civil law, where the magistracy was vested in the Proprietor, who had a leasehold from the Duchy of Cornwall of the islands' land area. Usually the Proprietor served as Governor, although, according to Robert Heath, a Major Bennett was Governor for a short time before Proprietor Francis Godolphin, 2nd Earl of Godolphin was commissioned on 7 July 1733. The Proprietor/Governor was non-resident, delegating the military functions to a Lieutenant-Governor and the civil functions to a Council of twelve residents.

An early governor of Scilly was Thomas Godolphin, whose son Francis received a lease on the Isles in 1568. The Godolphins and their Osborne relatives held this position until 1831, when George Osbourne, 6th Duke of Leeds surrendered the lease to the islands, with them then returning to direct rule from the Duchy of Cornwall. In 1834 Augustus Smith acquired the lease from the Duchy for £20,000, and created the title Lord Proprietor of the Isles of Scilly. The lease remained in his family until it expired for most of the Isles in 1920 when ownership reverted to back to the Duchy of Cornwall. Today, the Dorrien-Smith family still holds the lease for the island of Tresco.

National government 
Politically, the islands are part of England, one of the four countries of the United Kingdom. They are represented in the UK Parliament as part of the St Ives constituency. As part of the United Kingdom, the islands were part of the European Union and were represented in the European Parliament as part of the multi-member South West England constituency.

Local government 

Historically, the Isles of Scilly were administered as one of the hundreds of Cornwall, although the Cornwall quarter sessions had limited jurisdiction there. For judicial purposes, shrievalty purposes, and lieutenancy purposes, the Isles of Scilly are "deemed to form part of the county of Cornwall".

The Local Government Act 1888 allowed the Local Government Board to establish in the Isles of Scilly "councils and other local authorities separate from those of the county of Cornwall"... "for the application to the islands of any act touching local government." Accordingly, in 1890 the Isles of Scilly Rural District Council (the RDC) was formed as a sui generis unitary authority, outside the administrative county of Cornwall. Cornwall County Council provided some services to the Isles, for which the RDC made financial contributions. The Isles of Scilly Order 1930 granted the council the "powers, duties and liabilities" of a county council. Section 265 of the Local Government Act 1972 allowed for the continued existence of the RDC, but renamed as the Council of the Isles of Scilly. This unusual status also means that much administrative law (for example relating to the functions of local authorities, the health service and other public bodies) that applies in the rest of England applies in modified form in the islands.

With a total population of just over 2,000, the council represents fewer inhabitants than many English parish councils, and is by far the smallest English unitary council. , 130 people are employed full-time by the council to provide local services (including water supply and air traffic control). These numbers are significant, in that almost 10% of the adult population of the islands is directly linked to the council, as an employee or a councillor.

The Council consists of 16 elected councillors, 12 of whom are returned by the ward of St Mary's, and one from each of four "off-island" wards (St Martin's, St Agnes, Bryher, and Tresco). The latest elections took place on 6 May 2021; all 15 councillors elected were independents. One seat, for the island of Bryher, received no nominations and remained vacant until filled by a further independent councillor on 28 May.

The council is headquartered at Town Hall, by The Parade park in Hugh Town, and also performs the administrative functions of the AONB Partnership and the Inshore Fisheries and Conservation Authority.

Some aspects of local government are shared with Cornwall, including health, and the Council of the Isles of Scilly together with Cornwall Council form a Local Enterprise Partnership. In July 2015 a devolution deal was announced by the government under which Cornwall Council and the Council of the Isles of Scilly are to create a plan to bring health and social care services together under local control. The Local Enterprise Partnership is also to be bolstered.

Flags 

Two flags are used to represent Scilly, The Scillonian Cross, selected by readers of Scilly News in a 2002 vote and then registered with the Flag Institute as the flag of the islands, and the flag of the Council of the Isles of Scilly, which incorporates the council's logo and represents the council. An adapted version of the old Board of Ordnance flag has also been used, after it was left behind when munitions were removed from the isles. The "Cornish Ensign" (the Cornish cross with the Union Jack in the canton) has also been used.

Emergency services 
The Isles of Scilly form part of the Devon and Cornwall Police force area. There is a police station in Hugh Town.

The Cornwall Air Ambulance helicopter provides cover to the islands.

The islands have their own independent fire brigade – the Isles of Scilly Fire and Rescue Service – which is staffed entirely by retained firefighters on all the inhabited islands.

The emergency ambulance service is provided by the South Western Ambulance Service with full-time paramedics employed to cover the islands working with emergency care attendants.

Education 

Education is available on the islands up to age 16. There is one school, the Five Islands Academy, which provides primary schooling at sites on St Agnes, St Mary's, St Martin's and Tresco, and secondary schooling at a site on St Mary's, with secondary students from outside St Mary's living at a school boarding house (Mundesley House) during the week. Sixteen- to eighteen-year-olds are entitled to a free sixth form place at a state school or sixth form college on the mainland, and are provided with free flights and a grant towards accommodation.

Economy

Historical context 
Since the mid-18th century the Scillonian economy has relied on trade with the mainland and beyond as a means of sustaining its population. Over the years the nature of this trade has varied, due to wider economic and political factors that have seen the rise and fall of industries such as kelp harvesting, pilotage, smuggling, fishing, shipbuilding and, latterly flower farming. In a 1987 study of the Scillonian economy, Neate found that many farms on the islands were struggling to remain profitable due to increasing costs and strong competition from overseas producers, with resulting diversification into tourism. Statistics suggest that agriculture on the islands now represents less than 2% of all employment.

Tourism 

Today, tourism is estimated to account for 85% of the islands' income. The islands have been successful in attracting this investment due to their special environment, favourable summer climate, relaxed culture, efficient co-ordination of tourism providers and good transport links by sea and air to the mainland, uncommon in scale to similar-sized island communities.

The islands' economy is highly dependent on tourism, even by the standards of other island communities. "The concentration [on] a small number of sectors is typical of most similarly sized UK island communities. However, it is the degree of concentration, which is distinctive along with the overall importance of tourism within the economy as a whole and the very limited manufacturing base that stands out".

Tourism is also a highly seasonal industry owing to its reliance on outdoor recreation, and the lower number of tourists in winter results in a significant constriction of the islands' commercial activities. However, the tourist season benefits from an extended period of business in October when many birdwatchers ("twitchers") arrive.

Ornithology
Because of its position, Scilly is the first landing for many migrant birds, including extreme rarities from North America and Siberia. Scilly is situated far into the Atlantic Ocean, so many American vagrant birds will make first European landfall in the archipelago.

If an extremely rare bird turns up, the island will see a significant increase in numbers of birdwatchers. This type of birding, chasing after rare birds, is called "twitching".

The islands are home to ornithologist Will Wagstaff.

Employment
The predominance of tourism means that "tourism is by far the main sector throughout each of the individual islands, in terms of employment... [and] this is much greater than other remote and rural areas in the United Kingdom". Tourism accounts for approximately 63% of all employment.

Businesses dependent on tourism, with the exception of a few hotels, tend to be small enterprises typically employing fewer than four people; many of these are family run, suggesting an entrepreneurial culture among the local population. However, much of the work generated by this, with the exception of management, is low skilled and thus poorly paid, especially for those involved in cleaning, catering and retail.

Because of the seasonality of tourism, many jobs on the islands are seasonal and part-time, so work cannot be guaranteed throughout the year. Some islanders take up other temporary jobs 'out of season' to compensate for this. Due to a lack of local casual labour at peak holiday times, many of the larger employers accommodate guest workers.

Taxation 
The islands were not subject to income tax until 1954, and there was no motor vehicle excise duty levied until 1971. The Council Tax is set by the Local Authority in order to meet their budget requirements. The Valuation Office Agency values properties for the purpose of council tax. The amount of council tax you have to pay depends on the band of your property as shown on the graph below. The valuation is based on what the property would have been worth in 1991.

Source 1: Council of the Isles of Scilly

Source 2: Isles of Scilly Council Tax

Transport 

St Mary's is the only island with a significant road network and the only island with classified roads - the A3110, A3111 and A3112. St Agnes and St Martin's also have public highways adopted by the local authority. In 2005 there were 619 registered vehicles on the island. The island also has taxis and a tour bus. Vehicles on the islands are exempt from annual MOT tests.

Fixed-wing aircraft services, operated by Isles of Scilly Skybus, operate from Land's End, Newquay and Exeter to St Mary's Airport. A scheduled helicopter service has operated from a new Penzance Heliport to both St Mary's Airport and Tresco Heliport since 2020. The helicopter is the only direct flight to the island of Tresco.

By sea, the Isles of Scilly Steamship Company provides a passenger and cargo service from Penzance to St Mary's, which is currently operated by the Scillonian III passenger ferry, supported until summer 2017 by the Gry Maritha cargo vessel and now by the Mali Rose. The other islands are linked to St. Mary's by a network of inter-island launches. St Mary's Harbour is the principal harbour of the Isles of Scilly, and is located in Hugh Town.

Tenure 
A majority of the freehold land of the islands is the property of the Duchy of Cornwall, with a few exceptions, including much of Hugh Town on St Mary's, which was sold to the inhabitants in 1949. The duchy also holds  as duchy property, part of the duchy's landholding. All the uninhabited islands, islets and rocks and much of the untenanted land on the inhabited islands is managed by the Isles of Scilly Wildlife Trust, which leases these lands from the Duchy for the rent of one daffodil per year.

Limited housing availability is a contentious yet critical issue for the Isles of Scilly, especially as it affects the feasibility of residency on the islands. Few properties are privately owned, with many units being let by the Duchy of Cornwall, the council and a few by housing associations. The management of these subsequently affects the possibility of residency on the islands.

Housing demand outstrips supply, a problem compounded by restrictions on further development designed to protect the islands' unique environment and prevent the infrastructural carrying capacity from being exceeded. This has pushed up the prices of the few private properties that become available and, significantly for the majority of the islands' populations, it has also affected the rental sector where rates have likewise drastically increased.

High housing costs pose significant problems for the local population, especially as local incomes (in Cornwall) are only 70% of the national average, whilst house prices are almost £5,000 higher than the national average. This in turn affects the retention of 'key workers' and the younger generation, which consequently affects the viability of schools and other essential community services.

The limited access to housing provokes strong local politics. It is often assumed that tourism is to blame for this, attracting newcomers to the area who can afford to outbid locals for available housing. Many buildings are used for tourist accommodation which reduces the number available for local residents. Second homes are also thought to account for a significant proportion of the housing stock, leaving many buildings empty for much of the year.

In December 2021, the Council bought a property to ease the housing crisis, which would be converted into 3 affordable homes. The Council also, in January 2022, declared a housing crisis, due to the housing crisis placing the islands in "real danger of putting essential services at risk, such as the hospital and school". The council also highlighted that 15 households would be homeless by March and would face having to move from the Islands.

Culture

People 

According to the 2001 UK census, 97% of the population of the islands are white British, with nearly 93% of the inhabitants born in the islands, in mainland Cornwall or elsewhere in England. Since EU enlargement in 2004, a number of central Europeans have moved to the island, joining the Australians, New Zealanders and South Africans who traditionally made up most of the islands' overseas workers. In 2005, their numbers were estimated at nearly 100 out of a total population of just over 2,000. The Isles have also been referred to as "the land that crime forgot", reflecting lower crime levels than national averages.

Sport 
One continuing legacy of the isles' past is gig racing, wherein fast rowing boats ("gigs") with crews of six (or in one case, seven) race between the main islands. Gig racing has been said to derive from the race to collect salvage from shipwrecks on the rocks around Scilly, but the race was actually to deliver a pilot onto incoming vessels, to guide them through the hazardous reefs and shallows. (The boats are correctly termed "pilot gigs"). The World Pilot Gig Championships are held annually over the May Day bank holiday weekend. The event originally involved crews from the Islands and a few crews from mainland Cornwall, but in the intervening years the number of gigs attending has increased, with crews coming from all over the South-West and further afield.

The Isles of Scilly is home to what is reportedly the smallest football league in the world, the Isles of Scilly Football League.

In December 2006, Sport England published a survey which revealed that residents of the Isles of Scilly were the most active in England in sports and other fitness activities. 32% of the population participate at least three times a week for 30 minutes or more.

There is a golf club with a nine-hole course (each with two tees) situated on the island of St Mary's, near Porthloo and Telegraph, which was founded in 1904.

Media 
It is a relay of the main transmitter at Redruth (Cornwall) and broadcasts BBC Radio 1, 2, 3, 4 and BBC Radio Cornwall and the range of Freeview television and BBC radio channels known as 'Freeview Light'. Radio Scilly, a community radio station, was launched in September 2007. In January 2020, Radio Scilly was rebranded as Islands FM.

The Isles of Scilly were featured on the TV programme Seven Natural Wonders as one of the wonders of South West England. Since 2007 the islands have featured in the BBC series An Island Parish, following various real-life stories and featuring in particular the newly appointed Chaplain to the Isles of Scilly. A 12-part series was filmed in 2007 and first broadcast on BBC2 in January 2008. After Reverend David Easton left the islands in 2009, the series continued under the same name but focused elsewhere.

See also 

 List of shipwrecks of the Isles of Scilly
 List of extreme points of the United Kingdom
 Three Hundred and Thirty Five Years' War

References

Further reading 
 
 
 Isles of Scilly Guidebook by Friendly Guides (2021) 
A Study of the Historic Coastal and Marine Environment of the Isles of Scilly. Cornwall Archaeological Unit, Cornwall Council, ed. by D. Charman et al. (Truro: Cornwall Archaeological Unit, Cornwall Council, 2015)

External links 

 Council of the Isles of Scilly
 

 
Areas of Outstanding Natural Beauty in England
Birdwatching sites in England
Celtic Sea
Dark-sky preserves in the United Kingdom
Duchy of Cornwall
Isles of Scilly
Isles of Scilly
Natural regions of England
Nature Conservation Review sites
Isles of Scilly
Ramsar sites in England
Special Protection Areas in England